The 1874 Kansas gubernatorial election was held on November 3, 1874. Incumbent Republican Thomas A. Osborn defeated Democratic nominee James C. Cusey with 56.41% of the vote.

General election

Candidates
Major party candidates 
Thomas A. Osborn, Republican
James C. Cusey, Democratic

Other candidates
W. K. Marshall, Temperance

Results

References

1874
Kansas
Gubernatorial